Imena na Stene (Cyrillic: Имена на стене, "names on the wall") is the third studio album by the Finnish doom metal band KYPCK. It was released on 21 March 2014 under the record label Ranka Kustannus. The album debuted at Finland's official list in number 9.

Track listing 
Prorok (Пророк) - 6:16
Imja na Stene (Имя на стене) - 4:53
Voskresenije (Воскресение) - 4:41
Deti Birkenau (Дети Биркенау) - 7:25
Grjaznyi geroi (Грязный герой) - 3:58
Kak philosophy gubit samootveržennyh, beskorystnyh bjurokratov (Как философия губит самоотверженных, бескорыстных бюрократов) - 4:30
Belorusski sneg (Белорусский снег) - 4:53
Vsegda tak bylo (Всегда так было) - 3:42
Etoi pesni net (Этой песни нет) - 5:06
Tros, gruzovik i temnyi Balkon (Tros, грузовик и темный балкон) - 7:47

Personnel 
Band
 A. K. Karihtala (Antti Karihtala) - drums
  S. Kukkohovi (Sami Kukkohovi) - guitar
  S. S. Lopakka (Sami Lopakka) - guitar
 E. Seppänen (Erkki Seppänen) - vocals
 J. T. Ylä-Rautio (Jaska Ylä-Rautio) - bass

Production
 Hiili Hiilesmaa - producer, recorder, mixer, master
 Jussi Kulomaa - recorder (vocals), producer (vocals), backing vocals in songs 4 and 6

Chart

References

External links 
 KYPCK Homepage

2014 albums
KYPCK albums